Karunai Ullam is a 1978 Tamil-language film directed by A. Bhimsingh. The film stars Srikanth and K. R. Vijaya. It is based on the novel Karunaiynal Alla by Jayakanthan.

Plot 

A lone middle-aged woman, Gauri, meets Mudaliar, another middle-aged man in the house of her boss. She also comes across her old lover, whom she did not marry to respect her mother's words. Her old lover comes in search of her and asks her to marry him as his ailing wife is dying. She refuses but decides to marry Mudaliar, to fill the gap, she feels in her life.

Cast 
 Srikanth
Vijayakumar
 K. R. Vijaya
Jaya
Suman

Production 
Karunai Ullam was produced by M. S. V. Movies, and was the last film directed by A. Bhimsingh to release.

Soundtrack

Reception 
Sreekanth received Tamil Nadu State Film Award for Best Actor for his performance in the film.

References

External links 
 

1970s Tamil-language films
1978 films
Films based on Indian novels
Films directed by A. Bhimsingh
Films scored by Shankar–Ganesh